James Howard Snook (September 17, 1879 – February 28, 1930) was an American athlete, veterinarian, and murderer.  He is the only Olympic gold medalist to be executed for murder.

Biography
Snook was a member of the U.S. Olympic Pistol Team, which won a Gold Medal in the Men's 30 metre team military pistol event at the 1920 Olympics in Antwerp, Belgium.

Later, Snook was the head of the Department of Veterinary Medicine at Ohio State University. He invented the snook hook, a surgical instrument which is still used in spaying animals.
He also was a founding member of the Alpha Psi veterinary fraternity.

Snook was convicted of murdering Theora Hix, a 24-year-old medical student with whom he had had a three-year sexual affair. Snook claimed at his Columbus, Ohio, trial that he had killed Hix because she was threatening to kill Snook's wife and family, and that he feared she would shoot him. The trial was considered shocking for the sexual activities discussed, including fellatio. The jury took 28 minutes to deliberate before finding Snook guilty, after which he was sentenced to death by electrocution.

Snook was executed on 28 February 1930 at the Ohio Penitentiary, by means of the electric chair. He was buried in Green Lawn Cemetery after a short service at the King Avenue Methodist Church.

References

External links 
 Ohio Exploration Society - Dr. Snook
 Forgotten Ohio
 The Short North Gazette of Columbus Ohio
 Ohio State University College of Veterinary Medicine Fraternity Bio
 

Ohio State University faculty
1879 births
1930 deaths
American veterinarians
Male veterinarians
Shooters at the 1920 Summer Olympics
Olympic gold medalists for the United States in shooting
American male sport shooters
American people convicted of murder
People executed for murder
20th-century executions by Ohio
Burials at Green Lawn Cemetery (Columbus, Ohio)
People executed by Ohio by electric chair
People convicted of murder by Ohio
Olympic medalists in shooting
People from Warren County, Ohio
20th-century executions of American people
Medalists at the 1920 Summer Olympics
Executed people from Ohio